The General Society of the War of 1812 is an American non-profit corporation and charitable organization of male descendants of American veterans of the War of 1812. The General Society was founded on January 9, 1854, at the Congress Hall in Philadelphia by Joel B. Sutherland.

Eligibility 

Membership is open to any male above the age of 18 who is a lineal descendant of one who served, in the army, navy, revenue-marine, or privateer service of the United States, during the War of 1812. Females above the age of 18 who qualify may apply to the United States Daughters of 1812.

History 

On January 9, 1854 (a day after the anniversary of the Battle of New Orleans), a group of over 1,500 War of 1812 veterans from across the United States met in convention at the Congress Hall in Philadelphia, having responded to a call issued by Joel B. Sutherland (1792–1861), a War of 1812 veteran and former Congressman from Philadelphia. Ostensibly called to draft resolutions pertaining to bounty land benefit legislation, the veterans assembled in Philadelphia acknowledged the need for an organization for mutual support and to perpetuate the history of the War of 1812. From this convention, the Society of the War of 1812 was founded and Sutherland was elected its first President. The Society met again in convention a year later in Washington, D.C., where they were received by President Franklin Pierce at the White House and lobbied members of Congress to secure the bounty land legislation, which was passed later in 1855. Sutherland's goal was to form a division of the Society of the War of 1812 in each state in the union. His vision for the organization was not completed at the time of his death in 1861. Shortly thereafter, the General Society of the War of 1812 began accepting sons and grandsons of Veteran members. The General Society of the War of 1812 is listed as an approved lineage society with the Hereditary Society Community of the United States of America.

Notable members 
Major General Adolphus Greely
Major General Theodore S. Peck, VTNG - Adjutant General of Vermont
Major General Joseph Wheeler
President Benjamin Harrison
Major General John R. Brooke
Brigadier General Charles Wheaton Abbot, Jr.
Major General John Cadwalader
Rear Admiral John D. Ford

See also 

 The Eighth
 United States Daughters of 1812
 National Society Sons of the American Revolution

References

Further reading 

 Society of the War of 1812. The Constitution and Register of Membership of the General Society of the War of 1812. Philadelphia: [Published by the Secretary-General, by order of the Society], 1895.
 Society of the War of 1812. The Constitution and Register of Membership of the General Society of the War of 1812 to Oct. 1, 1899: Organized September 14, 1814. Re-Organized January 9, 1854. Instituted in Joint Convention at Philadelphia, Pa., April 14, 1894. Philadelphia, Pa: Dewey & Eakins, makers, 1899.
 General Society of the War of 1812, and Frederick Ira Ordway. Register of the General Society of the War of 1812. 1972.
 Blizzard, Dennis F. The Roster of the General Society of the War of 1812. Mendenhall, Pa: The Society, 1989.
 General Society of the War of 1812. General Society of the War of 1812: Triennial Yearbook 1987–90. [Place of publication not identified]: General Society Of The War Of 1812, n.d.
 General Society of the War of 1812. General Society of the War of 1812: Organized September 14, 1814. [Place of publication not identified]: The Society, 1908.
 Society of the War of 1812. The Charter, Constitution and Rules of the General Society of the War of 1812: With the Register of Membership. Philadelphia: s.n, 1800.
 Society of the War of 1812. Society of the War of 1812 in the District of Columbia: Organized April 18, 1896 : Admitted to the General Society June 19, 1896. Washington, D.C.: [publisher not identified], 1934.
 Society of the War of 1812 in Virginia. The Constitution and Register of Membership of the General Society of the War of 1812 to October 1, 1899. Philadelphia, Pennsylvania: Society of the War of 1812, 1899.
 Society of the War of 1812. Society of the War of 1812 in the District of Columbia. Washington, D.C.: [publisher not identified], 1900.
 Blizzard, Dennis F. Descendants of War of 1812 Veterans: General Society of the War of 1812 : Founders' Register, Commemoration, 1894–1994. Mendenhall, PA: The Society, 1994.
 General Society of the War of 1812. 1812 War Cry. Mendenhall, PA: General Society of the War of 1812, 1900.
 General Society of the War of 1812. Proceedings of the ... Biennial Meeting Held at. Philadelphia: General Society of the War of 1812, 1800.
 Biennial Conference of the General Society of the War of 1812. The 29th Biennial Convention of the General Society of the War of 1812 in Conjunction with the 142nd Annual Defenders Day Dinner of the Society of the War of 1812 in the State of Maryland. [Baltimore, Md.]: [General Society], 1956.
 General Society of the War of 1812. Proceedings of the Fifteenth, Sixteenth, Seventeenth, Eighteenth and Nineteenth Biennial Meetings: Held at Baltimore, Maryland September 12, 1928, Weymouth, Massachusetts September 13, 1930, Washington, District of Columbia October 1, 1932, Asbury Park, New Jersey September 22, 1934 and West Point, New York September 26, 1936. Philadelphia: General Society of the War of 1812, 1938.
 Society of the General War of 1812. Proceedings of the Tenth Biennial Meeting Held at Baltimore, Sept. 12, 1914. 1914.
 Society of the War of 1812 in the State of California, Dennis W. Simpson, and Lee E. Bishop. The 2002 California Yearbook. [Glendale]: Society of the War of 1812 in the State of California, 2002.

External links 

 Official
 
 
Hereditary Society Community of the United States of America
 General information
 General Society of the War of 1812 at The Online Books Page
 

 
501(c)(3) organizations
1854 establishments in Pennsylvania
Aftermath of the War of 1812 in the United States
Charities based in the United States
Service organizations based in the United States
Lineage societies
Lobbying organizations in the United States
Men's organizations in the United States
Nonpartisan organizations in the United States
Non-profit organizations based in the United States
Organizations established in 1854
Patriotic societies